The Austin Western Railroad  is a short-line railroad headquartered in Round Rock, Texas. AWRR is a subsidiary of Watco.

AWRR operates a  line from Fairland, Texas to an interchange with the Union Pacific at Elgin. Tracks also continue  from Elgin to an interchange with UPRR at Giddings. There is an additional interchange with the UPRR at McNeil. AWRR has rights to operate a  branch from Fairland to Marble Falls, and also  from Fairland to Llano but these tracks have not seen revenue service in decades and the bridge is washed out at the Little Llano River approximately six miles east of Llano. This portion comprises the Austin and Northwestern Railroad Historic District.

The line, the ultimate successor to the Austin and Northwestern Railroad, was part of the Houston and Texas Central Railway, and later part of the Texas and New Orleans Railroad followed by the Southern Pacific. It is now owned by Capital Metropolitan Transportation Authority, with which AWRR has had the contract from September 2007 to operate freight service. AWRR traffic includes aggregates, crushed limestone, calcium bicarbonate, lumber, beer, chemicals, plastics and paper.

In addition, the Austin Steam Train Association operates excursion trains between Cedar Park and Burnet.

External links
 Austin Western Railroad website
 Link to Union Pacific Website with AUAR Details
 Austin Steam Train Association

Texas railroads
Watco